The Razor's Edge is a 1984 American drama film directed and co-written by John Byrum starring Bill Murray, Theresa Russell, Catherine Hicks, Denholm Elliott, Brian Doyle-Murray, and James Keach. The film is an adaptation of W. Somerset Maugham's 1944 novel The Razor's Edge.

This marked Murray's first starring role in a dramatic film, though he did inject some of his dry wit into the script. The book's epigraph is dramatized as advice from the Katha Upanishad: "The path to salvation is narrow and as difficult to walk as a razor's edge."

Plot
In Illinois in 1917, just before the United States joins World War I, a fair has been planned to raise money to support Gray Maturin and Larry Darrell, who are joining the war in Europe as ambulance drivers. Larry looks forward to returning home to marry his longtime sweetheart Isabel. Larry shares a final night with Isabel watching the fireworks along with Gray, their close friend Sophie, and her husband Bob.

At the front, commanding officer Piedmont schools his new men on the harsh reality of war. For example, he has both of them armed, because in spite of it being an ambulance unit and America's neutrality, the enemy can and will kill those helping the Allies. He also destroys the headlights and windows of a fellow ambulance truck because the lights will signal enemies to their unit. Larry adapts quickly, shooting the headlights and windows of his own truck.

Larry witnesses the deaths of soldiers and fellow ambulance drivers, and is in constant danger. By the time America is deeply in the war, Larry's unit is down to a few men. During an unexpected encounter with German soldiers, Piedmont is fatally stabbed trying to block a German soldier from shooting a wounded Larry. The war ends not long after, and when Gray and he return to America, Larry suffers survivor's guilt and realizes that his life has changed. His plans to join Gray in working for Gray's father as a stockbroker will not make him happy, so he puts off his engagement to Isabel and travels to Paris in an effort to find meaning in his life. Isabel's uncle, Elliott Templeton, assures her that some time in Paris will help clear Larry's mind and take away any jitters he has about marriage.

Instead of following Elliott's suggestions of staying at first-class hotels and wining and dining with the aristocracy, Larry lives a simple life, reading philosophy books in a cheap hotel. He finds work, first as a fish packer, then as a coal miner. After saving the life of a coworker by pushing him out of the way of an out-of-control mine car, he has a conversation about books with the elder miner. The miner discusses a Russian magician's book, lends a copy of the Upanishads, and suggests that Larry travel to India to gain a different perspective.

In India, Larry joins a Buddhist monastery. As an exercise, he hikes to the top of a snow-covered mountain and meditates alone. After running out of firewood, he starts to burn books that he brought along. He finds his sense of inner peace. A monk lets him know that his journey is not over, that "the path to salvation is narrow and as difficult to walk as a razor's edge."

Returning to Paris, Larry first re-encounters Elliott, who lets him know that many things have changed, notably that Isabel has married Gray. (She had ended her relationship with Larry after a disastrous reunion in Paris not long after he first arrived.)  They have had two children. Gray and Isabel were forced to move to Elliot's house in Paris after the Great Depression bankrupted Gray's livelihood. His spirit was also shattered when his father committed suicide after the crash. Larry learns that, while he was gone, Sophie lost both Bob and her child in a car accident and turned to alcohol, opium, and prostitution.

Larry immediately attempts to reform Sophie, and after a period of time, they become engaged. Isabel insists that she will buy Sophie a wedding dress as a gift. During their conversation, Isabel admits she still loves Larry and condemns Sophie, labeling her a burden on Larry. She is interrupted by a phone call and leaves Sophie alone with a bottle of liquor.

Larry searches for Sophie and finds her at an opium den with her former pimp. After a confrontation, Larry is left bleeding in the street with a black eye, while Sophie stays in the establishment. The next morning, Larry is awakened by two men at the door and brought to the morgue to identify Sophie's body. Her throat had been slashed by a razor. Larry then goes to Elliott's house to try to figure out what went wrong the previous day. Elliott has had a stroke and has been given his last rites. Larry confronts Isabel about what happened and forces her to admit her role in driving Sophie back to the bottle. She tells Larry what she did is no different from Larry ruining their relationship by running off to find the meaning of his "goddammed life", but she admits that she still loves him and did not want anyone (including Sophie) to hurt him the way she, Isabel, had been hurt when Larry left her for the war.

Before Larry can respond, they are interrupted by the final moments of Elliott's life. Larry does a good deed for Elliott by convincing him that the Parisian aristocrats have not forgotten about him. (He had been waiting for an invitation to a costume party thrown by a French princess.) After Elliott dies, Larry comforts the grief-stricken Isabel. He admits that his journey was about trying to lead a good life that would make him worthy of Piedmont's sacrifice. Isabel and he part on reasonable terms, and he says his goodbyes to her and to Gray. He states his intention to depart for home, which prompts the question "Where is home?" He replies, "America".

Cast
Bill Murray as Larry Darrell
Theresa Russell as Sophie MacDonald
Catherine Hicks as Isabel Bradley
Denholm Elliott as Elliott Templeton
James Keach as Gray Maturin
Peter Vaughan as Mackenzie
Brian Doyle-Murray as Piedmont
Faith Brook as Louisa Bradley
Saeed Jaffrey as Raaz
Richard Oldfield as Doug Van Allen
André Maranne as Joseph, the Butler
Bruce Boa as Maturin

Production

Development
According to an interview with director John Byrum published on August 8, 2006, in the San Francisco Bay Guardian, he had wanted to film an adaptation of Maugham's book in the early 1980s. The director brought a copy of the book to his friend Margaret "Mickey" Kelley, who was in the hospital after giving birth. Byrum remembers getting a call the next day at 4:00 am, "and it was Mickey's husband, Bill [Murray]. He said, 'This is Larry, Larry Darrell.'"

Byrum and Murray drove across America while writing the screenplay. What they had written did not resemble the previous film version. Murray included a farewell speech to his recently deceased friend John Belushi in the script; this appears as Larry Darrell's farewell speech to Piedmont, a fellow ambulance driver in World War I.

While Murray was attached to the project, Byrum had trouble finding a studio to finance it. At one stage, 20th Century Fox planned to make it. Murray wanted to play the part because "it was a different kind of character, calmer, more self-aware."

Dan Aykroyd suggested that Murray could appear in Ghostbusters for Columbia Pictures in exchange for the studio's approving to make The Razor's Edge. Murray agreed and a deal was made with Columbia.

Filming
For the next year and a half, cast and crew shot on location in France, Switzerland, and India with a $12 million budget. The Indian locations were primarily in the Indian Himalayas. After the last day of principal photography, Murray left to make Ghostbusters.

Executive Producer Rob Cohen said, "It's a timeless story about someone looking for values in this world. It's about a transition. Well, who can make a more extreme transition, somebody like Bill Hurt, who looks pensive to begin with, and will wind up simply a little more spiritual than he was in the first place, or a Bill Murray, who can begin as the class clown, go to war, come back, and having had traumatic experiences, start to question?"

Reception
The film was a commercial failure, grossing a little more than $6 million, half of its $12 million production budget.

Critical response
Janet Maslin of The New York Times called the film "slow, overlong, and ridiculously overproduced," as well as "so disjointed that Mr. Murray, for all his wise-cracking inappropriateness, is all that holds it together." Roger Ebert gave the film two-and-a-half stars out of four and judged the movie "flawed," pointing to the hero as "too passive, too contained, too rich in self-irony, to really sweep us along in his quest." He placed the blame on Murray's shoulders, saying he "plays the hero as if fate is a comedian and he is the straight man". Todd McCarthy of Variety wrote, "Conceived as a major career departure for comic star Bill Murray, The Razor's Edge emerges as a minimally acceptable adaptation of W. Somerset Maugham's superb novel. Tonally inconsistent and structurally awkward, film does develop some dramatic interest in the second half, but inherent power of the material is never realized." Gene Siskel of the Chicago Tribune gave the film three stars out of four and remarked that "the movie stands or falls on whether Murray is able to disappear into his character of a young man searching for meaning in life after experiencing the horror of World War I. The feeling here is that Murray successfully meets that challenge by playing his character with both a quick comic tongue and with soulful eyes. His character's sense of humor is vintage Murray; his soulfulness is deep and genuine." Patrick Goldstein of the Los Angeles Times wrote, "It's possible that moviegoers will find this mystic glider ride to the snowcapped peaks of the Himalayas painfully earnest, especially for a comic of Murray's wise-guy gifts. But Murray, in his first serious role, is anything but miscast. He's perhaps the best thing about this intriguing but stubbornly ineffectual drama that only fitfully revives the dated charm of Maugham's rambling, meditative novel." Paul Attanasio of The Washington Post wrote that "this longtime pet project of Murray's will only disappoint his fans," finding the juxtaposition of Murray's comedic sensibility with the 1920s setting "jarringly bizarre" and the supporting cast "uniformly lousy."

Since its release, The Razor's Edge has developed something of a following, and criticism has softened. Nathan Rabin of The A.V. Club, reviewing the film in 2007, felt, "If The Razor's Edge is ultimately a failure, it's an honest, noble one", and that there were "all manner of minor pleasures to be gleaned along the way."

As of January 2020, review aggregator Rotten Tomatoes gives the film a 50% rating based on 16 reviews. Murray stated he deluded himself that there would be major interest in the film as a period piece, while the studio wanted to make a modern movie. Afterwards Murray realized his mistake, but said he still would have found the experience worth it if the film had never been released.

See also
The Razor's Edge, a 1946 adaptation with Tyrone Power and Gene Tierney

References

External links

The Razor's Edge Film Site called www.theoldcorner.org.uk

1984 films
1984 drama films
American drama films
Columbia Pictures films
Films shot at EMI-Elstree Studios
Films scored by Jack Nitzsche
Films based on British novels
Films based on works by W. Somerset Maugham
Films set in India
Films set in Paris
Films set in the 1910s
Films set in the 1920s
Films set in the 1930s
Films shot in France
Films shot in India
Films shot in Switzerland
1980s English-language films
1980s American films